The Fond du Lac Mudhens were the latest name of  a minor league baseball team based in Fond du Lac, Wisconsin that played in the Wisconsin State League between 1891 and 1911.

References

External links
Baseball Referenced

Baseball teams established in 1891
Baseball teams disestablished in 1911
1891 establishments in Wisconsin
1911 disestablishments in Wisconsin
Wisconsin State League teams
Wisconsin-Illinois League teams
Professional baseball teams in Wisconsin
Defunct baseball teams in Wisconsin
Fond du Lac, Wisconsin